Trebaseleghe is a comune (municipality) in the Province of Padua in the Italian region Veneto, located about  northwest of Venice and about  northeast of Padua.

The town houses the headquarters of Grafica Veneta, the Italian publisher of the Harry Potter books, which partially converted its production to protective masks for the general population during the 2019-20 COVID-19 pandemic in Italy.

References

Cities and towns in Veneto